Niavarani is a Persian surname. Notable people with the surname include:

 Michael Niavarani (born 1968), Austrian comedian
 Shebly Niavarani (born 1979), Persian-Swedish actor
 Shima Niavarani (born 1985), Persian-Swedish singer

Persian-language surnames